Findláech mac Ruaidrí (died 1020) was the ruler of Moray, in the north of modern-day Scotland, from some point before 1014 until his death in 1020.

Historians are fairly certain that Findláech was ruling before 1014 because the Orkneyinga saga reads that before the Battle of Clontarf, Jarl Siguðr of Orkney fought a battle with the Scots, who were led by a Jarl Finnlekr (i.e. Findláech the Mormaer). An Irish princess called Eithne made a banner for Siguðr, which had on it a raven. The saga records that Siguðr later brought the banner to Clontarf, where he was killed. If we believe this, then Findláech would be ruler quite a bit before 1014.

However, Findláech's main claim to fame these days is as the father of Mac Bethad, made famous by William Shakespeare's play Macbeth. Indeed, the Irish historian known in Latin as Marianus Scotus calls Macbethad simply MacFindlaeg.

At his death in 1020 Findláech is described in the Annals of Tigernach as Mormaer of Moray, but in the Annals of Ulster as King of Alba. The 12th century Scottish King-lists only record the Alpinid king Máel Coluim mac Cináeda reigning as King of Alba at the time, having succeeded Cináed mac Duib directly. This suggests that Findláech, as ruler of Moray, had challenged Máel Coluim for the throne of Alba, and as neither had been able to prevail over the other the kingdom had effectively been divided.

His death date, as mentioned above, derives from the Annals of Ulster, which notes s.a. 1020 Finnloech m. Ruaidhri, ri Alban, a suis occisus est, that is, that Findláech was killed by his own people. No reason for this is given, but the logical thing is to conclude that his successor, his nephew Máel Coluim mac Máil Brigti, had something to do with it. Indeed, the Annals of Tigernach tell us that the sons of Máel Brigte were responsible; the only sons we know of are Máel Coluim and Gille Coemgáin, both of whom evidently benefited from the killing, as both succeeded to the throne.

References

Bibliography
 Anderson, Alan Orr, Early Sources of Scottish History: AD 500-1286, 2 vols., (Edinburgh, 1922)

External links
 Annals of Ulster
 Annals of Tigernach
 Book of Deer

1020 deaths
Findleach
People from Moray
11th-century Scottish monarchs
Year of birth unknown
Orkneyinga saga characters
Mormaers of Moray
11th-century mormaers